Teodoro García Egea (born 27 January 1985) is a Spanish politician. He was the secretary-general of the People's Party, second to president Pablo Casado in party hierarchy. He has been a member of the 10th, 11th, 12th and 13th terms of the Congress of Deputies representing Murcia.

Early life and education
Teodoro or "Teo" (as he is often hypocoristically known by) García Egea was born on 27 January 1985 in Cieza, Region of Murcia. When he was still dealing with his graduate studies as Telecommunications Engineer, he was elected municipal councillor in Cieza, serving in that capacity from 2007 to 2009. A partaker in the 2008 Mollar Chafá olive pit spitting competition in his native city, he won and was proclaimed as the World Champion in the speciality, reaching 16.84 m. After finishing his degree of Telecommunications engineering at the Universidad Politécnica de Cartagena (UPCT), he started his postgraduate studies, initially at the University of Maryland.

García Egea earned a PhD in Robotics at the UPCT, with the reading of a dissertation titled Análisis, decodificación y clasificación de la señal EEG en entornos tridimensionales in December 2015.

Political career
García Egea ran 9th in the People's Party (PP) list for the constituency of Murcia vis-à-vis the November 2011 Congress of Deputies election. In a crushing PP victory in the staunchly conservative constituency that delivered a 64.22% of valid votes to the party, the PP obtained 8 seats out of a total of 10.

García Egea was re-elected to his seat at the Congress of Deputies in the 2015 and 2016 general elections, in which García Egea ran 1st in the PP list for Murcia. Following the announcement of the resignation of Mariano Rajoy as President of the PP in June 2018, he worked for Pablo Casado, a prospective candidate to become leader of the party, assisting him as campaign director. Casado was elected President of the PP among the party delegates in a second round voting, and soon after Casado appointed García Egea as the Secretary-General of the party.

He renovated his seat for the 13th term of the Congress of Deputies in the 2019 general election.

Personal life 
In March 2012, García Egea married María José Escasaín, a chemical engineer, whom he had been dating 5 years.

Notes

References 

 

Living people
1985 births
People's Party (Spain) politicians
Members of the 10th Congress of Deputies (Spain)
Members of the 11th Congress of Deputies (Spain)
Members of the 12th Congress of Deputies (Spain)
Members of the 13th Congress of Deputies (Spain)
Members of the 14th Congress of Deputies (Spain)
Spanish municipal councillors
People from Cieza, Murcia